Stadion Broodstraat was an Association football or soccer venue located in Antwerp, Belgium. The venue hosted the Royal Antwerp FC from 1908 to 1923. It served as the main venue for the football tournament at the 1920 Summer Olympics.

References
History of the Royal Antwerp FC stadiums. 
Sports-reference.com 1920 Summer Olympics football.

Sports venues completed in 1908
Venues of the 1920 Summer Olympics
Olympic football venues
Defunct sports venues in Belgium
Football venues in Flanders
Sports venues in Antwerp Province
Buildings and structures in Antwerp
1908 establishments in Belgium